তবুও (Yet) is the fourth studio album by Bangladeshi rock band LRB released on 12 June 1994 by Sargam Records. It was the band's first and the only album to feature Milton Akbar on drums.

Track listing

Personnel 
 Ayub Bachchu - lead vocals, lead guitars
 S.I. Tutul - keyboards, rhythm guitars, backing vocals
 Saidul Hasan Swapan - bass guitar
 Milton Akbar - drums

References 

1994 albums
Love Runs Blind albums